Jayatilleka is a Sri Lankan surname. Notable people with the surname include:

 Bhathiya Jayatilleka (died 2000), Sri Lankan military officer
 Dayan Jayatilleka (born 1956), Sri Lankan academic, diplomat, writer, and politician

Sinhalese surnames